Monte Antola (in Ligurian munte Antua) is a mountain in Liguria, northern Italy, part of the Ligurian Apennines.

Geography 
The mountain is located between the provinces of Genoa and Alessandria. It lies at an altitude of 1597 metres.
Close to the summit is located the Rifugio Parco Antola, a mountain hut built by the Ente Parco and managed by the Club Alpino Italiano. It can accommodate up to 32 hikers or alpinists.

Access to the summit
Several footpaths meet on mount Antola starting from the surrounding valleys. Among them can be cited:
the route from Bavastrelli (Propata), which reaches the summit in a couple of hours passing near the new mountain hut built by the natural park;
the route from Caprile, another village of Propata municipality, which after the saddle near Monte delle Tre Croci reaches the summit following the Po Valley/Ligurian Sea water divide. It takes around 2.30 hours' walking;
the route from Crocefieschi, through the Incisa pass, demanding more than 4 hours of walk;
the route from Torriglia through monte Carmo (around 3 hours).

Conservation 
The southern side of the mountain since 1989 is included in the Parco naturale regionale dell'Antola.

References

Mountains of Liguria
Mountains of Piedmont
One-thousanders of Italy
Mountains of the Apennines